Muthukrishnaperi is a village comes under Tenkasi district, Tamil Nadu, India. It is located between Alangulam and Surandai. It is a Panchayath union comes under Melakrishnaperi.

Occupations 
Most of the people are working in the Agriculture fields. Some of them are working in the Windmills and factories surrounded to this village. Very few are working as professionals.

Facilities
It has one government aided child care center and one High school named Hindu Middle school.

Climate 
It has two ponds. The famous waterfall Courtallam is near to this village. So at the time of Courtallam season, this village is also getting chill climate and drizzling.
Normally this village looks green except the summer season.

Since the number of vehicles in this village are low, this village is free of pollution.

Religion 
Christianity and Hinduism are the normal religions followed by the people here. People are well connected with each other and there is no diversity here based on religion or caste

References 
 Population of India

Villages in Tenkasi district